Gladys' Leap is the fourteenth studio album by Fairport Convention originally released in August 1985. It was recorded in April and May 1985 at Woodworm Studios, Barford St. Michael, Oxfordshire, UK. It was produced and engineered by Simon Nicol, Dave Mattacks and Dave Pegg and the assistant engineers were Tim Matyear and Mark Powell. The album features the first contributions to a Fairport album by founding member Richard Thompson since Rosie in 1973. Thompson wrote the opening track "How Many Times" and played lead guitar on "Head in a Sack".

The title comes from Gladys Hillier, who was a postwoman for Cranham, a village near Stroud in Gloucestershire, England. As a short-cut, to save a two-mile walk, she used to jump a three feet (~ 1 metre) wide stream on her round. In 1977 the Ordnance Survey agreed to name the spot in her honour, and in 2005 a footbridge was built across the stream.  Fairport heard the story, and named the album in Gladys' honour.

Track listing

Side one (The Folkside)
 "How Many Times" (Richard Thompson) - 3:29
 "Bird from the Mountain" (Ralph McTell) - 4:51
 "Honour and Praise" (John Richards) - 5:21
 "The Hiring Fair" (Ralph McTell, Dave Mattacks)	 - 5:53

Side two (The Backside)
 Instrumental Medley '85 - 5:08
 "The Riverhead" (Dave Pegg)
 "Gladys' Leap" (Dave Pegg)
 "The Wise Maid" (Traditional;  arrangement by Simon Nicol and Dave Pegg)
 "My Feet are Set for Dancing" (Cathy Lesurf, arranged by Bill Martin) - 4:01
 "Wat Tyler" (Ralph McTell, Simon Nicol) - 5:36
 "Head in a Sack" (Dave Whetstone) - 4:23

Personnel
Fairport Convention
Simon Nicol - vocals, electric & acoustic guitars
Dave Pegg - bass guitar, mandolin, bouzouki, double bass, vocals
Dave Mattacks - drums, drum machine, keyboards, percussion

Additional personnel
Ric Sanders - violin ("Bird from the Mountain", "The Hiring Fair", Instrumental Medley)
Richard Thompson - electric guitar ("Head in a Sack")
Cathy Lesurf - vocal ("My Feet Are Set for Dancing")
Harold Wells - spoken intro to "Bird from the Mountain"

References

External links
 Fan site with trivia and reissue details

1985 albums
Fairport Convention albums
Albums produced by Simon Nicol